Alian District is a rural district in Kaohsiung, Taiwan.

History
After the handover of Taiwan from Japan to the Republic of China in 1945, Alian was organized as a rural township of Kaohsiung County. On December 25, 2010, Kaohsiung County was merged with Kaohsiung City and Alian was upgraded to a district of the city.

Geography
The district is located at the northeast of the Kaohsiung Plain on the north end of western Kaohsiung City, between the Erren River and the Agongdian River.

Administrative divisions
The district consists of Shian, Zhonglu, Fengshan, Ganghou, Gangshan, Alian, Qinglian, Helian, Jingqi, Fuan, Yuku and Nanlian Village.

Tourist attractions
 Chaofeng Temple (大崗山超峰寺)
 Dagang Mountain Scenic Area
 Erren River
 Guander Temple (光德寺)
 Lianfeng Temple (大崗山蓮峰寺)

Transportation
The district is connected to Tainan's Xinhua District through Provincial Highway 39, to Luzhu and Tianliao through Provincial Highway 28, and to Guanmiao, Tainan and Gangshan through Provincial Highway 19A.

Notable natives
 Ho Ming-tsan, football player

See also 
 Kaohsiung

References

External links